Ken McDonald (born September 26, 1957) is a retired American soccer forward who played in the North American Soccer League, Major Indoor Soccer League and American Soccer League.

McDonald played for the Penn State Nittany Lions men's soccer team from 1975 to 1978.  In 1979, McDonald played for both the San Jose Earthquakes and Tulsa Roughnecks of the North American Soccer League.  In 1980, he moved to the Pennsylvania Stoners of the American Soccer League where he was a 1981 First Team All Star.  In the fall of 1981, he signed with the Denver Avalanche of the Major Indoor Soccer League.  In 1983, he joined the St. Louis Steamers where he played two seasons before being released in July 1985.

References

External links
 NASL stats

1955 births
Living people
American soccer players
American Soccer League (1933–1983) players
Denver Avalanche players
North American Soccer League (1968–1984) players
Pennsylvania Stoners players
Penn State Nittany Lions men's soccer players
San Jose Earthquakes (1974–1988) players
St. Louis Steamers (original MISL) players
Tulsa Roughnecks (1978–1984) players
Soccer players from Philadelphia
Association football defenders